Acacia fecunda, commonly known as Mosquito Creek wattle, is a shrub belonging to the genus Acacia and the subgenus Juliflorae that is endemic to north western Australia.

Description
It has terete and slender branchlets that are finely ribbed and densely covered in fine what hairs. Like most species of Acacia it has phyllodes rather than true leaves. The glabrous or slightly hairy phyllodes are coriaceous and often slightly resinous with fine parallel longitudinal nerves. The plant blooms between May and August producing yellow flowers.

Distribution
It is native to an area in the Pilbara region of Western Australia. It has only a few disjunct populations that are situated near where the Oakover River and Davis River meet to the east of Nullagine in rocky areas composed of Mosquito Creek sedimentary rocks.

See also
 List of Acacia species

References

fecunda
Acacias of Western Australia
Taxa named by Bruce Maslin
Plants described in 2008